The 1st CC.NN. Division "23 Marzo" was an Italian CC.NN. (Blackshirts militia) division raised on 23 April 1935 for the Second Italo-Ethiopian War against Ethiopia. The name "23 Marzo" ("March 23rd") was chosen to commemorate the founding date of the Fasci Italiani di Combattimento on 23 March 1919. The division took part in the Italian invasion of Egypt and was destroyed during the Battle of Bardia in January 1941.

History 
The division was one of six CC.NN. divisions raised in summer 1935 in preparation for the Second Italo-Ethiopian War. Its members were volunteers from the various armed militias of the National Fascist Party's paramilitary wing and came from two regions: the 135th and 192nd CC.NN. legions, and the I CC.NN. Machine Gun Battalion from Tuscany and the 202nd CC.NN. Legion from Umbria.

Second Italo-Ethiopian War 
The division arrived in Massawa in Italian Eritrea between 28 August and September 1935. On 3 October the division crossed the Balasa river into Ethiopia. The division participated in the Battle of Amba Aradam and then in the Second Battle of Tembien. After the war the division was repatriated and then disbanded.

World War II 
The division was reformed in Chieti in 1939 and sent with three other CC.NN. divisions to Italian Libya. The division took part in the invasion of Egypt in September 1940, reaching Sidi Barrani in Egypt by October. On 1 December 1940 the division was at Bardia, where it was surrounded with other Italian units by British forces during Operation Compass. After a short siege the division was destroyed during the Battle of Bardia on 3-5 January 1941.

Organization

1935 
Below follows the division's organization during the Second Italo-Ethiopian War and the cities, in which its CC.NN. battalions and companies/batteries were raised.

 1st CC.NN. Division "23 Marzo"
 135th CC.NN. Legion "Indomita", in La Spezia
 Command Company
 CXXXV CC.NN. Battalion, in La Spezia
 CLXXXVIII CC.NN. Battalion, in Livorno
 135th CC.NN. Machine Gun Company, in Volterra
 135th CC.NN. Artillery Battery, in Rome (65/17 infantry support guns)
 192nd CC.NN. Legion "Francesco Ferrucci", in Florence
 Command Company
 CXC CC.NN. Battalion, in Pisa
 CXCV CC.NN. Battalion, in Florence
 192nd CC.NN. Machine Gun Company, in Empoli
 192nd CC.NN. Artillery Battery, in Florence (65/17 infantry support guns)
 202nd CC.NN. Legion "Cacciatori del Tevere", in Perugia
 Command Company
 CCII CC.NN. Battalion, in Perugia
 CCIV CC.NN. Battalion, in Terni
 202nd CC.NN. Machine Gun Company, in Arezzo
 202nd CC.NN. Artillery Battery, in Rome (65/17 infantry support guns)
 I CC.NN. Machine Gun Battalion, in Pisa
 I Artillery Group (65/17 infantry support guns, Royal Italian Army)
 I Mixed Transport Unit (Royal Italian Army)
 I Supply Unit (Royal Italian Army)
 1st Special Engineer Company (Royal Italian Army)
 1st Medical Section (Royal Italian Army)
 1st Logistic Section (Royal Italian Army)
 1st Carabinieri Section

The supply unit had 1,600 mules and the mixed transport unit 80 light trucks. The division engaged in war crimes in Ethiopia during the Second Italo-Ethiopian War.

1940 
Below follows the division's organization at the start of the Italian invasion of Egypt and the cities, in which its CC.NN. battalions were raised.

  1st CC.NN. Division "23 Marzo"
 219th CC.NN. Legion, in Frosinone
 Command Company
 CXIV CC.NN. Battalion, in Tivoli
 CXVIII CC.NN. Battalion, in Velletri
 CXIX CC.NN. Battalion, in Frosinone
 219th CC.NN. Machine Gun Company
 233rd CC.NN. Legion, in Campobasso
 Command Company
 CXXIX CC.NN. Battalion, in Pescara
 CXXXIII CC.NN. Battalion, in Campobasso
 CXLVIII CC.NN. Battalion, in Foggia
 233rd CC.NN. Machine Gun Company
 201st Motorized Artillery Regiment (Royal Italian Army)
 Command Unit
 I Group (100/17 howitzers)
 II Group (75/27 field guns)
 III Group (75/27 field guns)
 2x Anti-aircraft batteries (20/65 Mod. 35 anti-aircraft guns)
 Ammunition and Supply Unit
 CCI Machine Gun Battalion (Royal Italian Army)
 CCI Mixed Engineer Battalion (Royal Italian Army)
 Command Platoon
 1x Engineer Company
 1x Telegraph and Radio Operators Company
 1x Searchlight Section
 201st CC.NN. Anti-tank Company (47/32 anti-tank guns)
 201st CC.NN. Support Weapons Battery (65/17 infantry support guns)
 201st CC.NN. Mortar Company (81mm Mod. 35 mortars)
 201st Transport Section (Royal Italian Army)
 201st Supply Section (Royal Italian Army)
 201st Medical Section (Royal Italian Army)
 3x Field hospitals
 1x Surgical Unit
 701st Carabinieri Section
 702nd Carabinieri Section
 301st Field Post Office

Attached during the Battle of Bardia:
 LXI Tank Battalion "L" (L3/33 and L3/35 tankettes, Royal Italian Army)

CC.NN. Grouping "23 Marzo" 
For the Italian participation in the Eastern Front the regiment-sized CC.NN. Grouping "23 Marzo" was raised as unit of the Italian Army in Russia:

 CC.NN. Grouping "23 Marzo"
 CC.NN. Battalions Group "Valle Scrivia"
 Command Company
 V CC.NN. Assault Battalion, in Tortona
 XXXIV CC.NN. Assault Battalion, in Savona
 XLI CC.NN. Support Weapons Battalion, in Trento
 CC.NN. Battalions Group "Leonessa"
 Command Company
 XIV CC.NN. Assault Battalion, in Bergamo
 XV CC.NN. Assault Battalion, in Brescia
 XXXVIII  Support Weapons Battalion, in Asti

Commanding officers 
During the Second Italo-Ethiopian War:

 Generale di Divisione Ettore Bastico (23 April 1935 - 20 October 1935)
 Generale di Divisione Prince Filiberto, Duke of Genoa (21 October 1935 - 29 February 1936)
 Generale di Divisione Carlo Carini (1 March 1936 - ?)

During the Italian invasion of Egypt:

 Generale di Divisione Francesco Antonelli (1939 - 5 January 1941, POW)

See also
 Division XXIII di Marzo

References

Sources

External links 
  Regio Esercito: Divisione CC.NN. "23 Marzo"

Blackshirt divisions of Italy
Divisions of Italy in World War II
Divisions of Italy of the Second Italo-Ethiopian War